Eoxizicus is a genus (or subgenus) of Asian bush crickets belonging to the tribe Meconematini. The recorded distribution is: India, Indochina, China and Korea.

Subgenera and species
Species have been placed here or at the original subgenus level as Xizicus (Eoxizicus).  The Orthoptera Species File currently lists:

 Eoxizicus bihammeris Liu, 2020
 Eoxizicus bimaculus (Liu, Chen, Wang & Chang, 2019)
 Eoxizicus choui (Liu & Zhang, 2000)
 Eoxizicus concavilaminus (Jin, 1999)
 Eoxizicus coreanus (Bey-Bienko, 1971)
 Eoxizicus danangi Gorochov, 1998
 Eoxizicus dao Gorochov, 1998
 Eoxizicus dentatus (Liu, Chen, Wang & Chang, 2019)
 Eoxizicus dischidus Di, Han & Shi, 2015
 Eoxizicus divergentis (Liu & Zhang, 2000)
 Eoxizicus dubius (Liu & Zhang, 2000)
 Eoxizicus duplum (Gorochov, 1998)
 Eoxizicus fengyangshanensis Liu, Zhou & Bi, 2010
 Eoxizicus furcutus Jiao & Shi, 2014
 Eoxizicus gaoligongshanensis (Cui, Liu & Shi, 2020)
 Eoxizicus hainani Gorochov & Kang, 2005
 Eoxizicus hsiehi (Liu, Chen, Wang & Chang, 2019)
 Eoxizicus howardi (Tinkham, 1956)
 Eoxizicus hue Gorochov, 2005
 Eoxizicus khaosoki Gorochov, 1998
 Eoxizicus kulingensis (Tinkham, 1943) - type species (as Xiphidiopsis kulingensis Tinkham), locality Guling, Guangxi
 Eoxizicus laminatus Shi, 2013
 Eoxizicus lobicercus (Chen, Mao & Chang, 2019)
 Eoxizicus magnus (Xia & Liu, 1992)
 Eoxizicus megalobatus (Xia & Liu, 1990)
 Eoxizicus meridianus (Xia & Liu, 1990)
 Eoxizicus orlovi Gorochov, 2005
 Eoxizicus parallelus (Liu & Zhang, 2000)
 Eoxizicus rehni (Tinkham, 1956)
 Eoxizicus ryabovi Gorochov, 2005
 Eoxizicus simianshanensis Wang & Shi, 2017
 Eoxizicus simplicicercis (Kevan & Jin, 1993)
 Eoxizicus sinuatus (Liu & Zhang, 2000)
 Eoxizicus streptocercus Jiao & Shi, 2014
 Eoxizicus taiwanensis Chang, Du & Shi, 2013
 Eoxizicus tam Gorochov, 1998
 Eoxizicus tinkhami (Bey-Bienko, 1962)
 Eoxizicus transversus (Tinkham, 1944)
 Eoxizicus tuberculatus (Liu & Zhang, 2000)
 Eoxizicus uncicercus Mao & Shi, 2015
 Eoxizicus wuzhishanensis (Liu & Zhang, 2000)
 Eoxizicus xiai (Liu & Zhang, 2000) (synonym E. curvicercus (Wang, Liu & Li, 2015))

References

External links
 

Meconematinae
Tettigoniidae genera
Orthoptera of Asia